Thubana raphidodea is a moth in the family Lecithoceridae. It was described by Kyu-Tek Park and John B. Heppner in 2009. It is found on Sulawesi and in Malaysia.

References

Moths described in 2009
Thubana